The Acta Psychiatrica Scandinavica is a Scandinavian peer-reviewed medical journal containing original research, systematic reviews etc. relating to clinical and experimental psychiatry. According to the Journal Citation Reports, the journal has a 2014 impact factor of 5.605. Its editor-in-chief is Ida Hageman (Region Hovedstadens Psykiatri).

See also 

 List of psychiatry journals

References

External links
 

English-language journals
Psychiatry journals
Publications established in 1926
Wiley-Blackwell academic journals
Monthly journals